Aura is the fourth studio album by German recording artist Yvonne Catterfeld, released by Sony Music on 20 October 2006 in German-speaking Europe.

Track listing

Charts

Weekly charts

Release history

References

External links
 YvonneCatterfeld.com — official site

2006 albums
Yvonne Catterfeld albums